Peter Bjørnskov, also known as just Bjørnskov, (born in Horsens, Denmark in 1981) is a Danish singer, songwriter and record producer. He is part of the songwriting team Startone Music with Sune Haansbæk and Lene Dissing. He has also released solo singles. He was previously part of the Danish band Neeva.

In Neeva
He started his career as a drummer in the Danish pop rock band Neeva, with Kenneth Potempa as the lead singer. The band released its first album, Where to Start, on 22 September 2008 and had a radio hit with "Star of Me".

Songwriter and producer
Bjørnskov has written many songs for a number of artists that took part in the Dansk Melodi Grand Prix as follows:
2010: "Breathing" sung by Bryan Rice (lyrics and music by Bjørnskov)
2011: "Sleepless" sung by Anne Noa (co-written by Bjørnskov, John Gordon and Lene Dissing)
2012: "Reach for the Sky" sung by Kenneth Potempa (co-written by Bjørnskov and Lene Dissing and Sune Haansbæk
2013: "Unbreakable" sung by Mohamed Ali (co-written by Bjørnskov and Morten Friis, Michael Parsberg and Lene Dissing)
2017: "One" sung by Ida Una (co-written by Bjørnskov and Lene Dissing)

Bjørnskov has also written for Sanne Salomonsen, Ankerstjerne, Kato, Electric Lady Lab, Thomas Ring and The Fireflies.

Discography

Albums
As part of Neeva
2008: Where to Start

Solo

Singles
Solo

Featured in

References

Danish songwriters
Danish record producers
1981 births
Living people
People from Horsens
21st-century Danish male  singers